S/2021 J 6 is a small outer natural satellite of Jupiter discovered by Scott S. Sheppard, David J. Tholen, and Chad Trujillo on 5 September 2021, using the 8.2-meter Subaru Telescope at Mauna Kea Observatory, Hawaii. It was announced by the Minor Planet Center on 20 January 2023, after observations were collected over a long enough time span to confirm the satellite's orbit. The satellite has been found in precovery observations as early as 2 October 2010.

References 

Carme group
Moons of Jupiter
Irregular satellites
20210905
Discoveries by Scott S. Sheppard
Moons with a retrograde orbit